Vikas Khanna (born 14 November 1971) is an Indian chef, restaurateur, cookbook writer, filmmaker and humanitarian. He is one of the judges of MasterChef India. He is based in New York City.

Early life and education
Khanna was born in Amritsar, India, to Davinder and Bindu Khanna. His mother still lives there. He did his schooling at St. Francis School, Amritsar. He was born with a leg deformity (club foot) and wasn't able to run until he was 13 years old. He was inspired by his Biji (grandmother) who loved to cook, and her kitchen became a part of his foundational training.

Khanna began developing recipes at a very young age and opened Lawrence Gardens Banquets to host weddings and family functions when he was 17. He graduated from Welcomgroup graduate school of hotel administration a constituent of  Manipal Academy of Higher Education in 1991.

Vikas Khanna also received an honorary doctorate at GD Goenka University as a recognition for his outstanding work in culinary art  philanthropy, altruism and humanitarianism and his global reach as a chef.

He has also studied at Culinary Institute of America and New York University.

Career
While in India, Khanna worked for the Taj Hotels, Oberoi group, Welcome group, and Leela Group of Hotels.

Khanna had worked at Salaam Bombay and The Café at the Rubin Museum of Art in New York before he joined Junoon, an upscale Indian restaurant in Flatiron district of Manhattan. Junoon received a favorable review from Sam Sifton in The New York Times in its inaugural year and was awarded a Michelin star by the Michelin Guide for six consecutive years since 2011.

He has also worked with top chefs including Gordon Ramsay, Eric Ripert, Bobby Flay and Jean-Georges Vongerichten.

In 2019, he opened a restaurant called Kinara in Dubai.  In 2020, he opened a restaurant called Ellora in Dubai.

Television shows
From 2011, Khanna hosted six seasons of MasterChef India (2, 3, 4, 5, 6 and 7) a series based on the original British version. He has been hosting all the seasons of the show since then. Khanna was invited as a guest judge on MasterChef Australia in Season 6.

He has hosted four seasons of the show Twist of Taste on Fox Life.

Khanna was featured as a Consultant chef to help a failing Indian restaurant named Purnima on the Gordon Ramsay TV series Kitchen Nightmares.

Khanna appeared as a judge and an Indian-cuisine specialist on the two-part season finale of Hell's Kitchen.

He has appeared on Throwdown! with Bobby Flay as a judge and as a guest chef on The Martha Stewart Show.

Film production

Khanna has produced a documentary series named Holy Kitchens, which explores the bond between faith and food. The series has been showcased at Harvard, Princeton, Columbia and Oxford Universities and Film Festivals.

His documentary Kitchens of Gratitude was featured at Marche du Film at the 69th Cannes Film Festival.

His directorial debut The Last Color is a film about the daily struggles for survival on the streets of the ancient city of Banaras, India. The teaser of the film featuring veteran Indian actress Neena Gupta was released at the 71st Cannes Film Festival. The film made it to the final list of Oscar 2020 Eligibility for Best Film.

Philanthropy
Khanna launched the foundation "South Asian Kid's Infinite Vision" (SAKIV) to focus on worldwide issues that demand urgent action such as Tsunami Relief, Hurricanes of the Gulf Coast, Haiti. In collaboration with charitable institutions, such as Save the Children, the foundation has hosted many events worldwide - from The Great Pyramid of Giza in Egypt to the Taj Mahal in India.

In 2018 Vikas Khanna built the first Culinary museum of India at his alma mater Welcomgroup Graduate School of Hotel Administration, Manipal.

"Cooking for Life" founded by Khanna in 2001 in New York along with the world's top chefs supports several social causes.

Vision of Palate is his award-winning workshop developed to educate people with visual disabilities about the sense of taste, flavor and aromas.

On 14 May 2012, Khanna cooked for a fundraiser hosted for President Obama at the Rubin Museum of Art in New York City

Khanna is the goodwill ambassador for Smile Foundation and supports the cause of malnutrition in India. He has pledged to raise 1 million US dollars for the same.

In April 2020, during the COVID-19 global pandemic, he started a "Feed India" initiative which is backed by Pepsi, India Gate, Quaker Oats, Hyatt Regency and Global Funds for Widows and delivers food and supplies to those in need in India.

Awards and recognitions
 Top 10 Chefs in the world by Deutsche Welle News and Gazette Review.
 Doctor of Philosophy (Honoris causa) Degree by the G D Goenka University.
 Doctorate in literature (Honoris causa) by D Y Patil University.
 James Beard Foundation Award nomination for his book Return to the Rivers in 2014.
 "Rising Star" Chef Award by Star Chefs for his role in shaping the future of American Cuisine(2011).
 GQ India Man of the year 2012 by GQ Magazine.
 Featured in the list of Sexiest Man Alive by People Magazine in November 2011.
 "Access to Freedom Award" in 2005 from SATH.
 The Shining Star Award from "Just One Break, Inc."
 Proclamation from the New York City Council for his outstanding contribution to the city, and was chosen "New Yorker of the Week" by NY1.
 Featured on the cover of Men's Health India Magazine in 2012.
 He was voted "New York's Hottest Chef" in a poll conducted by the New York Eater blog.

Bibliography
1. Ayurveda - The Science of Food and Life

2. Mango Mia - Celebrating the tropical world of Mangoes

3. The Cuisine of Gandhi - Based on the beliefs of the Legend

4. The Spice Story of India

5. New York Chefs Cooking for Life

6. Modern Indian Cooking

7. Flavors First: An Indian Chef's Culinary Journey

8. My Great India Cookbook

9. Khanna Sutra: Food Lessons in Love

10. Everyone Can Cook

11. Savour Mumbai: A Culinary Journey Through India's Melting Pot

12. Young Chefs

13. Return to the Rivers - Recipes and Memories of the Himalayan River Valleys

14. Bliss of Spices - The Essence of Indian Kitchen

15. Hymns from the Soil - A Vegetarian Saga

16. Amritsar - Flavours of the Golden city

17. The Magic Rolling Pin

18. World Feast - My Favourite Kitchen

19. MasterChef India Cookbook

20. Shaken & Stirred - 101 non-alcoholic blends

21. Timeless Legacy - His Holiness the Dalai Lama

22. The Milk Moustache

23. UTSAV - A Culinary Epic of Indian Festivals

24. Indian Harvest - Classic and Contemporary Vegetarian Dishes

25. Essence of Seasoning - My All Time Favorite Recipes

26. Mocktails, Punches, and Shrubs

27. My First Kitchen

28. A Tree Named Ganga

29. POEATRY - Poems from the heart of farms and a kitchen

30. PÃTRA - Heritage of the Indian Kitchen

31. The Last Color

32. The Wholesome Grain

33. Pilgrim's Flavors

34. Ceremony of Aromas

35. Magic of Slow Cooking

36. Back to our Roots

37. BARKAT

38. Sacred Foods of India

39. Barefoot Empress

See also
 Indians in the New York City metropolitan area

References

External links

 
 https://m.imdb.com/name/nm2301454

American chefs
Indian chefs
Indian food writers
Artists from Amritsar
1971 births
Living people
Canadian Sikhs
Chefs of Indian cuisine
Head chefs of Michelin starred restaurants
People from New York (state)
Manipal Academy of Higher Education alumni
Asia Game Changer Award winners